The 1954 Dixie Classic was a mid-season college basketball tournament held December 27–29, 1954 at NC State's Reynolds Coliseum in Raleigh, North Carolina. It was the sixth iteration of the Dixie Classic and it was part of the 1954–55 NCAA men's basketball season.

Coming into the tournament, undefeated NC State and reigning champion Duke were considered favorites. The NC State Wolfpack won the final, defeating the Minnesota Golden Gophers 85–84.

Ronnie Shavlik of NC State was named most valuable player. Across the three days of six double-headers, the total attendance was 65,000.

Teams
Each year, the Dixie Classic included the "Big Four" teams (Duke, NC State, North Carolina, and Wake Forest), as well as four other invited teams. The 1954 teams were:
 Southern California Trojans
 North Carolina Tar Heels
 Cornell Big Red
 NC State Wolfpack
 Minnesota Golden Gophers
 Wake Forest Demon Deacons
 West Virginia Mountaineers
 Duke Blue Devils

Bracket

Game log

References

External links
 
 1954 Dixie Classic program via NC State Libraries

1954–55 NCAA men's basketball season
1954 in sports in North Carolina
December 1954 sports events in the United States
1954